Donald Thomas Younger Curry, Baron Curry of Kirkharle,  (born 4 April 1944) is a British farmer and businessman who is the former chair of NFU Mutual (2003-2011) and non-executive chair of the Better Regulation Executive, and a member of the House of Lords.

Curry was appointed a Commander of the Order of the British Empire (CBE) in the 1997 New Year Honours, and was knighted in the 2001 Birthday Honours.

In 2001–2 he chaired the Policy Commission on the Future of Farming and Food, known as the Curry Commission, which produced a report for the Secretary of State for Environment, Food and Rural Affairs.

On the recommendation of the House of Lords Appointments Commission, he was created a Crossbench (independent) life peer on 13 October 2011 taking the title Baron Curry of Kirkharle, of Kirkharle in the County of Northumberland. He was introduced in the House of Lords on 24 October 2011. In the introduction ceremony, his supporters were the Lord Plumb and the Baroness Byford.

Lord Curry is a member of the All-party parliamentary group ("APPG") Christians in Parliament.

References

Living people
Commanders of the Order of the British Empire
Knights Bachelor
21st-century British landowners
Crossbench life peers
People's peers
1944 births
Life peers created by Elizabeth II